Aek Godang Airport is an airport in South Tapanuli Regency, North Sumatra, Indonesia.

Airlines and destinations

The following destinations are served from this airport:

Statistics

References

Airports in North Sumatra